Taylor Municipal Airport  is a city-owned public-use airport located two nautical miles (4 km) west of the central business district of Taylor, a city in Williamson County, Texas, United States.

The airport is located on Highway 79 and it is an important component of economic development for the City of Taylor and the region.  The Texas Department of Transportation Aviation Division has classified the airport as a general utility business service airport.

Airport fly-in events are scheduled several times a year and include aircraft from all over the region.

Lodging, food, and ground transportation at or near the airport include: Best Western Hotel, Mas Fajitas Restaurant and Bar, and Enterprise Car Rental.

History 
Originally a grass airstrip built in the 1930s, the runway was paved in the 1970s. The airport was acquired by the City of Taylor in 1998. In 2000, the runway was expanded from 3,000 to 4,000 feet.

Facilities and aircraft 
It has one runway designated 17/35 with a 4,000 by 75 ft (1,219 x 23 m) asphalt surface. For the 12-month period ending July 16, 2008, the airport had 26,100 aircraft operations, an average of 71 per day, all of which were general aviation. At that time there were 11 aircraft based at this airport: 91% single-engine and 9% multi-engine.

References

External links 
 Taylor Municipal Airport, official site
 http://www.dot.state.tx.us/AVN/avninfo.htm
 http://www.dot.state.tx.us/travel
 
 

Airports in Texas
Transportation in Williamson County, Texas
Buildings and structures in Williamson County, Texas
Airports in Greater Austin